Clan McQuillan is an Irish clan that descends from the north coast of County Antrim in Ulster in the north-east of Ireland. Still a popular name throughout County Antrim, the McQuillans are known mostly for their association with Dunluce Castle and for their battles with the Scottish McDonnell clan.

Origin of name
The name McQuillan is of disputed origin, with two prevailing theories:
They descend from Hugelin de Mandeville, with McQuillan claiming to be from Mac Uighilín meaning son of Hugelin. This idea has been challenged with historical sources clearly showing that the McQuillans and de Mandevilles were two different families.
They descend from Fiacha MacUillin, youngest son of Niall of the Nine Hostages. This idea has proved problematic as the full ancient genealogy of the McQuillan was lost in the 1760s by Ephraim MacQuillan.

Spelling variations for the name McKellen include: McQuillan, McQuillen, McQuillian, McQuillin, McQuillon, McCailin, McAilin, MacQuillian, MacQuillon, MacCaillion, MacQuillin, MacQuillan, McKillan, McQuilland, McAiland, McAylin, McCaillion, McKillion, McKillin, McKillon, MacKillan, MacQuilland, MacAyland, MacAilan, Quillan and many more.

History
In 1442, according to the Annals of Ulster, the MacQuillan-O'Cahan feud started.

By the 1460s, with the earldom of Ulster near its end, the surviving de Mandevilles of north Antrim deserted their manors in Twescard and sold their interests to the MacQuillans who were already established there. The MacQuillans would rename Twescard, the Route, after their "rout", a common term then for a private army. Their principal residence in the Route was at Dunluce Castle, near the mouth of the River Bush.

The end of the MacQuillan-O'Cahan feud came in 1559, when their allies, the MacDonnells of the Glens turned upon them. Sorley Boy MacDonnell, with the aid of levies from Scotland, launched a mass assault on the Route against the MacQuillans. The final battle of this assault was at Aura, and saw the end of the MacQuillans and the conquest of the Route by the MacDonnells.

See also
Twescard
Earldom of Ulster

External links
McQuillan Clan Association

References

15th century in Ireland
Irish families
16th century in Ireland